Watir (Web Application Testing in Ruby, pronounced water), is an open-source family of Ruby libraries for automating web browsers.  It drives Internet Explorer, Firefox, Chrome, Opera and Safari, and is available as a RubyGems gem.  Watir was primarily developed by Bret Pettichord and Paul Rogers.

Functionality 

Watir project consists of several smaller projects. The most important ones are watir-classic, watir-webdriver and watirspec.

Watir-classic 
Watir-classic makes use of the fact that Ruby has built in Object Linking and Embedding (OLE) capabilities. As such it is possible to drive Internet Explorer programmatically.  Watir-classic operates differently than HTTP based test tools, which operate by simulating a browser. Instead Watir-classic directly drives the browser through the OLE protocol, which is implemented over the Component Object Model (COM) architecture.

The COM permits interprocess communication (such as between Ruby and Internet Explorer) and dynamic object creation and manipulation (which is what the Ruby program does to the Internet Explorer). Microsoft calls this OLE automation, and calls the manipulating program an automation controller. Technically, the Internet Explorer process is the server and serves the automation objects, exposing their methods; while the Ruby program then becomes the client which manipulates the automation objects.

Watir-webdriver 
Watir-webdriver is a modern version of the Watir API based on Selenium.  Selenium 2.0 (selenium-webdriver) aims to be the reference implementation of the WebDriver specification.  In Ruby, Jari Bakken has implemented the Watir API as a wrapper around the Selenium 2.0 API.  Not only is Watir-webdriver derived from Selenium 2.0, it is also built from the HTML specification, so Watir-webdriver should always be compatible with existing W3C specifications.

Watirspec 
Watirspec is executable specification of the Watir API, like RubySpec is for Ruby.

See also 

 Acceptance testing
 Regression testing
 List of web testing tools
 Test automation

References

External links 
 Watir home page
 Watir source code
 The Watir Podcast
 Cucumber & Cheese A Testers Workshop book by Jeff Morgan

Graphical user interface testing
Ruby (programming language)
Web development software
Web scraping
Software using the BSD license